Jerry Leggio (born September 23, 1935) is an American actor. He was born in Baton Rouge, Louisiana.

Career 
He has appeared in such films as Sounder, Sister, Sister, The Badge and American Violet and in two episodes of In the Heat of the Night. He also appeared in two episodes of American Horror Story: Freak Show as Dr. Bonham and in the TV movies The Ernest Green Story, Ruffian and Mothman. He has had uncredited roles in the films Hush...Hush, Sweet Charlotte and Alvarez Kelly. His stage roles include The Best Little Whorehouse in Texas (as Sheriff Dodd), A Streetcar Named Desire (as Stanley), A Few Good Men (as Colonel Jessup), Inherit the Wind (as Henry Drummond), The King and I (as the King), Camelot (as King Arthur) and The Sound of Music (as Captain Von Trapp). In 2015 he guest starred in an episode of Scream Queens.

Filmography

Film

Television

References

External links 

Living people
American male actors
People from Baton Rouge, Louisiana
1935 births